Kallikrein-10 is a protein that in humans is encoded by the KLK10 gene.

Kallikreins are a subgroup of serine proteases having diverse physiological functions. Growing evidence suggests that many kallikreins are implicated in carcinogenesis and some have potential as novel cancer and other disease biomarkers. This gene is one of the fifteen kallikrein subfamily members located in a cluster on chromosome 19. Its encoded protein is secreted and may play a role in suppression of tumorigenesis in breast and prostate cancers. Alternate splicing of this gene results in multiple transcript variants encoding the same protein.

References

Further reading

External links
 The MEROPS online database for peptidases and their inhibitors: S01.246